The Coupe des Carpathes is a one-day cycling race held annually in the Subcarpathian Voivodeship, Poland. It was first held in 2002, and since 2005 has been part of the UCI Europe Tour as a 1.2 event.

Past winners

External links

Recurring sporting events established in 2002
Cycle races in Poland
UCI Europe Tour races
Sport in Podkarpackie Voivodeship
2002 establishments in Poland
Summer events in Poland